Victoricus (or Victorice, Victoric), Fuscian (or Fulcian, Fulcien, Fuscien) and Gentian (or Gentien) (died circa 287–303) were three Christian martyrs later venerated as Roman Catholic saints. Their feast day falls on 11 December.

Hagiography
According to tradition, Victoricus and Fuscian were missionaries from the city of Rome were preaching the Christian religion in the city of Therouanne, and in the areas inhabited by the people known as the Morini. They were followers of Saint Quentin, as well as of Crispin and Crispinian.

Near Amiens, they met Gentian, who warned them that Christians were being killed for their faith. Later, the governor Rictius Varus (Rictiovarus) questioned Gentian about the whereabouts of Victoricus and Fuscian. Gentian refused to tell him and was consequently beheaded. According to the Golden Legend, the governor later brought Victoricus and Fuscian to Amiens. "Then took spears of iron and put them through their ears and through their nostrils, and had them decapitated. And by the will and power of our Lord, they arose up, and took their heads in their hands, and bare them two miles far from the place where they had been beheaded." It is said that all three were buried at the place called Saint-Fuscien.

Veneration

It is said that Honoratus of Amiens, seventh bishop of Amiens (d. ca. 600), had discovered in his diocese the relics of these martyrs. Childebert attempted to possess these relics, but was prevented from removing them. Subsequently, the king made generous gifts to endow the cult of the three saints and sent goldsmiths to fashion decorative pieces in their honour.

Statues of Fuscian, Gentian and Victoricus stand in the left portal of Amiens Cathedral.

During the 7th century, Saint Audomare (Omer) re-evangelized the same area.

References

External links
Stephen Murray, The Portals: Access to Redemption
 Saint Victoric et Saint Fuscien

Saints trios
280s deaths
3rd-century Christian martyrs
3rd-century Gallo-Roman people
Cephalophores
Gallo-Roman saints
Year of birth unknown
Groups of Christian martyrs of the Roman era